Kenedy Silva Có (born 30 November 1998) is a Guinea-Bissauan footballer  who plays for Pau FC as a forward.

He started his career with Sporting CP B.

Club career
On 20 August 2017, Có made his professional debut with Sporting B in a 2017–18 LigaPro match against Real.

Pau FC unveiled his signing on Facebook on 2 August 2018.

References

External links

1998 births
Living people
Bissau-Guinean footballers
Association football forwards
Liga Portugal 2 players
Championnat National players
Sporting CP B players
Pau FC players